Thanks A Lot, Milton Jones! is the fourth comedy programme starring Milton Jones to be broadcast by BBC Radio 4 (the others being The Very World of Milton Jones, The House of Milton Jones and Another Case of Milton Jones).  The first series was broadcast on Radio 4 in February and March 2014, with the second series broadcast between December 2015 and February 2016.  The third series ran during May and June 2018, the fourth during March and April 2020 and the fifth during May and June 2022.

Episode list

References

External links

BBC Radio 4 Extra programmes
2014 radio programme debuts